or  is a lake and reservoir in the municipalities of Hattfjelldal and Hemnes in Nordland county, Norway. It has been the site of human occupation since the Stone Age. Its area of  makes it the second largest lake in Norway by surface area. Without the dam which has regulated the lake since 1957, it would be  and the third largest lake in Norway.

References

External links

Archeological article (in Norwegian) (URL accessed 7 April 1983)

Lakes of Nordland
Hattfjelldal
Hemnes
Reservoirs in Norway